John Currie may refer to:

John Currie (architect) (1839–1922), Scottish architect
John Currie (artist) (c. 1884–1914), English artist
John Currie (cross-country skier) (1910–1989), Canadian Olympic skier
John Currie (footballer, born 1921) (1921–1984), English football player
John Currie (footballer, born 1939), Scottish football player
John Currie (soccer), American soccer player
John Currie (Australian footballer) (1931–1997), Australian rules footballer
John Currie (sportsman) (1932–1990), British rugby union player and cricketer
John Allister Currie (1862–1931), Canadian author, journalist and political figure

John Cecil Currie (1898–1944), British Army officer during World War II
John Lang Currie (1818–1898), Australian pastoralist
John S. Currie (1877–1956), Canadian politician and journalist
John Currie Gunn (1916–2002), Scottish scientist
John Currie (athletic director) (born 1971), athletic director at Wake Forest University
John Currie (minister) (d.1720) Moderator of the General Assembly of the Church of Scotland in 1709

See also
John Curry (disambiguation)